The United States' Jennifer Capriati defeated the defending gold medalist, Germany's Steffi Graf, in the final, 3–6, 6–3, 6–4 to win the gold medal in Women's Singles tennis at the 1992 Summer Olympics. It was the first victory for the United States in the event since 1924, and the first medal in the event for united Germany (rather than West Germany) since 1912. The United States' Mary Joe Fernández and Spain's Arantxa Sánchez Vicario won the bronze medals. It was Spain's first medal in the women's singles.

The tournament was held from 28 July to 7 August at the Tennis de la Vall d'Hebron in Barcelona, Spain. There were 64 competitors from 30 nations, with each nation having up to 3 players.

Background

This was the seventh appearance of the women's singles tennis. A women's event was held only once during the first three Games (only men's tennis was played in 1896 and 1904), but has been held at every Olympics for which there was a tennis tournament since 1908. Tennis was not a medal sport from 1928 to 1984, though there were demonstration events in 1968 and 1984.

Germany's Steffi Graf was the defending Olympic champion (who had achieved the Golden version of the Grand Slam in 1988) and the #1 seed again in 1992. Two of her top competitors, Martina Navratilova of the United States and Monica Seles of Yugoslavia, were ineligible because they had not played in the Billie Jean King Cup. The #2 seed was home crowd favorite Arantxa Sánchez Vicario. The United States had the #3 seed and #4 seed in young phenom Jennifer Capriati and Mary Joe Fernández.

Chile, the People's Republic of China, Latvia, Madagascar, Poland, Romania, South Africa, and Switzerland each made their debut in the event; some former Soviet republics competed as the Unified Team. France and Great Britain each made their sixth appearance, tied for most among nations to that point.

Competition format

The competition was a single-elimination tournament. Unlike previous Olympic tournaments, no bronze medal match was held. All matches were best-of-three sets. The 12-point tie-breaker was used in any set, except the third, that reached 6–6.

Schedule

All times are Central European Summer Time (UTC+2)

Seeds

Draw

Finals

Top half

Section 1

Section 2

Bottom half

Section 3

Section 4

References

 ITF Olympic Site

Women's Singles
1992 in women's tennis
Women's events at the 1992 Summer Olympics